Animal Park is a BBC television documentary series about the lives of keepers and animals at Longleat Safari Park, Wiltshire, England. The show is presented by Kate Humble, Ben Fogle and Megan McCubbin, with appearances by members of Longleat staff and the landowners, the Thynn family.

As of August 2022, the main series has aired 17 times, usually during school holidays and broadcast on weekdays in the daytime as daily episodes.

Content
Programmes show the animals, keepers, and day-to-day running of the safari park. Some of the animals captured the hearts of the viewing public, including the tiger 'Kadu', rhinos 'Babs' and 'Winston', and Europe's oldest male silverback gorilla, 'Nico'.

Alexander Thynn, 7th Marquess of Bath, owner of the Longleat estate until his death on 4 April 2020, appeared regularly in the show. Animal Park also documents the running of Longleat House and the ongoing preservation of its historic contents.

History

Original series
The first series of Animal Park, originally broadcast in 2000 on BBC One, was presented by Kate Humble and Paul Heiney. In series two, Heiney was replaced by Ben Fogle. Altogether, there were nine series and 150 episodes of Animal Park, with the last episode originally airing on 25 March 2009.

The forerunner to Animal Park was a BBC One series called Lion Country, also filmed at Longleat Safari Park, which aired in 1998 and 1999 with a total of 55 episodes.

Spin-offs
There have been two spin-offs from the main series. Animal Park: Wild in Africa was originally broadcast in 2005 on BBC Two. Set in Namibia, it documented the work of wildlife conservationists.

Another spin-off, Animal Park: Wild on the West Coast, had a similar format in California, and was originally broadcast in 2007 on BBC Two.

2016 revival
In 2016, the BBC announced that Animal Park would return for a tenth series to celebrate the 50th anniversary of Longleat Safari Park. This series aired for five episodes in August 2016 in a daytime slot. The show was renamed Animal Park: Summer Special and was presented by Kate Humble and Ben Fogle, with Jean Johansson as a reporter.

An eleventh series was broadcast in 2017. Five episodes aired during Easter, with a further ten airing during the summer.

Animal Park: Summer Special, series twelve, was aired in August 2018. Episode 3 celebrated the life of the gorilla 'Nico', who died in January 2018 at the age of 56. Episode 7 featured wildlife photographer Will Burrard-Lucas, who used his remote-control BeetleCam to take a series of close-up photographs of the animals.

Humble and Fogle continued as presenters for the 2019 and 2020 series.

Series fourteen, episode 4 (first aired in August 2020) celebrated the life of the former owner of the Longleat estate, Alexander Thynn, 7th Marquess of Bath, who died in April 2020. His son Ceawlin Thynn, 8th Marquess and his wife Emma have since appeared on several episodes.

Series fifteen, aired in December 2020, had a Christmas theme. In 2021, wildlife cameraman Hamza Yassin joined the presenting team.

Series seventeen aired in August 2022, with Megan McCubbin replacing Johansson.

Transmissions

Main series

Some episodes from series six and eight have been re-edited into 15, 25, 30 and 45 minute programmes to be repeated and used as schedule fillers.

Animal Park: Wild in Africa

Animal Park: Wild on the West Coast

References

External links

Animal Park at the Internet Movie Database
Longleat Safari Park's official website
Longleat - As featured on BBC's Animal Park (archived in 2009)

BBC television documentaries
2000 British television series debuts
2000s British documentary television series
2010s British documentary television series
2020s British documentary television series
Films set in zoos
British television series revived after cancellation
English-language television shows
Television shows set in Wiltshire